Norma Dee Edwards, also known as Dee Edwards, (July 11, 1912October 26, 1994) was a Michigan politician.

Early life
Edwards was born on July 11, 1912 in Spring Arbor Township, Michigan to Arthur S. and Hazel F. Edwards. Edwards was from a family of ten siblings. At age thirteen, Edwards left home and became self-sufficient. She worked as a maid while attending high school.

Education
Edwards attended Detroit public schools. Edwards first attended Wayne State University in 1931. After going to New York, she returned and earned her A.B. from the university in 1935. She also earned an L.L.B. from Detroit College of Law.

Career
Edwards was a lawyer. On November 2, 1948, Edwards was elected to the Michigan House of Representatives where she represented the Wayne County 1st district from January 5, 1949 to 1950. Edwards was not elected to the same position in 1952. Edwards was a candidate in the Democratic primary for the Michigan Senate seat representing the 4th district in 1950. In 1962, Edwards was a candidate in a primary to be a delegate to the Michigan state constitutional convention from Wayne County 2nd district.

Death
Edwards died on October 26, 1994 in Royal Oak, Michigan.

References

1912 births
1994 deaths
Michigan lawyers
People from Jackson County, Michigan
Women state legislators in Michigan
Wayne State University alumni
Detroit College of Law alumni
Democratic Party members of the Michigan House of Representatives
20th-century American politicians
20th-century American women politicians
20th-century American lawyers